Lynwood Wayne Lewis Jr. (born November 26, 1961) is an American politician and lawyer. A Democrat, he was elected to the Virginia House of Delegates in November 2003, representing the 100th district, which consists of the Eastern Shore counties of Accomack and Northampton, and parts of the cities of Norfolk and Hampton.

On November 16, 2013, Lewis won the Democratic Party nomination for Virginia's 6th Senate district, which had been held by lieutenant governor-elect Ralph Northam (D). On January 10, 2014, the Virginia State Board of Elections certified that Lewis had won the special election for Northam's senate seat by only nine votes out of over 20,000 cast.  His Republican opponent sought a recount, which was held on January 27. After most of the recount had been completed, it became clear that Lewis's lead had held and his opponent conceded.  Lewis was sworn in on January 28, 2014, giving Democrats control of the chamber.

In March 2023, Lewis announced he would not run for reelection this year.

Electoral history

Notes

References

External links

1961 births
Living people
Democratic Party members of the Virginia House of Delegates
Virginia lawyers
Hampden–Sydney College alumni
University of Richmond School of Law alumni
People from Nassawadox, Virginia
21st-century American politicians
Democratic Party Virginia state senators